Jirah Military Airbase (sometimes spelled  al-Jarrah) is a small Syrian airbase of the Syrian Arab Air Force. After surrounding the airbase in the middle of January 2013, the base was captured by opposition fighters from Ahrar al-Sham and the Free Syrian Army on 12 February. It fell under ISIL control in January 2014. On 9 March 2017 the Syrian Army launched an assault to recapture the airbase. On 12 May 2017, the SAA recaptured the airbase from ISIS in the Maskanah Plains offensive and had it fully secured by 29 May. It was reopened in January 2023. A Syrian Air Defense Force unit is stationed there.

See also
 List of Syrian Air Force bases

References 

Syrian Air Force bases
Military installations of Syria